In homological algebra, the horseshoe lemma, also called the simultaneous resolution theorem, is a statement relating resolutions of two objects  and  to resolutions of
The name of the lemma comes from the shape of the diagram illustrating the lemma's hypothesis.

Formal statement
Let  be an abelian category with enough projectives.  If

is a diagram in  such that the column is exact and the
it can be completed to a commutative diagram

where all columns are exact, the middle row is a projective resolution
If  is an
abelian category with enough injectives, the dual statement also holds.

The lemma can be proved inductively. Then the snake lemma is invoked to show that the simultaneous resolution constructed so far has exact rows.

See also
Nine lemma

References

Homological algebra
Lemmas in category theory